Ab Ghar (also Romanized as Āb Ghār; also known as Āb Qār) is a village in Pian Rural District, in the Central District of Izeh County, Khuzestan Province, Iran. At the 2006 census, its population was 54, in 9 families.

References 

Populated places in Izeh County